The men's 60 metres hurdles event at the 2019 European Athletics Indoor Championships was held on 2 March 2019 at 12:02 (heats), and on 3 March 2019 at 11:05 (semifinals) and 18:10 (final) local time.

Medalists

Records

Results

Heats

Qualification: First 3 in each heat (Q) and the next 6 fastest (q) advance to the Semi-Finals.

Semifinals

Qualification: Qualification: First 3 in each heat (Q) and the next 2 fastest (q) advance to the Final.

Final

References

2019 European Athletics Indoor Championships
60 metres hurdles at the European Athletics Indoor Championships